The River Sine or Sine River (Siin in Serer language) is a river in Senegal. It flows into the Atlantic Ocean with the River Saloum in the delta of Sine-Saloum.

See also
Saloum Delta National Park, a UNESCO World Heritage site.
Saloum River
Sine-Saloum

External links
 « Le pacte primordial dans la vallée du Sine » (articles [in] Éthiopiques n° 31)

Rivers of Senegal
Serer holy places
Serer country